Shirin Taylor (born 1956) is an English actress, best known for playing Jackie Ingram in the television soap opera Coronation Street from 1990 to 1992 as well as Tina, girlfriend to Robert Lindsay's character in comedy drama Give Us a Break and Rosa in sitcom I Woke Up One Morning.

Acting career 
Doctor Who serials The Stones of Blood and Dragonfire 
Crown Court
The Cleopatras
Shine on Harvey Moon
One by One
Crossroads (as Sue Kirk in 1985)
Boon
Dramarama
The Ruth Rendell Mysteries
The Bill
Casualty
A Touch of Frost
Hetty Wainthropp Investigates
London's Burning
Holby City
Night & Day
Doctors

Theatre work
On stage, Taylor made her West End debut in Educating Rita, firstly as understudy to star Julie Walters and then taking over the role of the leading lady.

References

External links
 
 Shirin Taylor at Theatricalia

British television actresses
Living people
1956 births